Unprotected Sets is an American documentary television series that premiered on October 5, 2018, on Epix.

On October 13, 2020, it was announced that the second season will premiere on October 16, 2020.

Premise
Unprotected Sets films in Portland, San Diego, Washington, D.C., Minneapolis, and Atlanta with each episode presenting "a compelling portrait of a comedian on the verge of breaking out to become the next big name in comedy. The diverse lineup of breakout talent offers insights into the motivations behind baring one’s soul for a living. Their dynamic, personal, and hilarious performances – where nothing is off limits – will show us exactly how, in their own inimitable way, each comedian turns life into art."

Episodes

Season 1 (2018)

Season 2 (2020-21)

Season 3 (2022)

Production
On August 16, 2018, it was announced that Epix had given the production a series order for a first season consisting of twelve episodes set to premiere on October 5, 2018. Executive producers were expected to include Wanda Sykes, Page Hurwitz, and Barry Poznick. Production companies were slated to consist of Push It Productions and MGM Television.

References

External links

2010s American comedy television series
2010s American documentary television series
2018 American television series debuts
2020s American comedy television series
2020s American documentary television series
English-language television shows
MGM+ original programming
Television series by MGM Television